Seckler is a surname. Notable people with the surname include:

Curly Seckler (1919–2017), American bluegrass musician
Erich Seckler (born 1963), German footballer
Phyllis Seckler (1917–2004), Soror Meral, a member Ordo Templi Orientis

See also
Sechler (disambiguation)
Steckler